Gowmazi Osman (also romanized as Gowmāzī ʿOs̄mān) is a village in Kambel-e Soleyman Rural District, in the Central District of Chabahar County, Sistan and Baluchestan Province, Iran. At the 2006 census, its population was 21, in 5 families.

References 

Populated places in Chabahar County